Charles Adolphe Ernest Wickersheimer (12 July 1880 – 6 August 1965) was a French physician, librarian and historian of medicine.

Wickersheimer was born in Bar-le-Duc where his father was a military doctor from Alsace. He studied medicine at Paris and received a doctorate in 1905 for a dissertation La médecine et les médecins en France à l'épogue de la Renaissance. He then trained as a librarian and worked at the library of the medical department of the University of Paris. He also interned at the University of Jena and worked with Karl Sudhoff at the University of Leipzig examining German sources on the history of medicine. In 1910 he became a librarian at the Académie de Médecine. He served as during World War I and received a Croix de Guerre medal. He became a director of the Strasbourg library after the war. He published the landmark two-volume dictionary of medical biography Dictionnaire biographique des médecins en France au Moyen-Ãge (1936). He also produced an edition of Simon de Phares' manuscript in 1929 which enabled a study of medieval astrology. He lost his position during German occupation and returned only after World War II to rebuild the library and retired in 1950. He was made officer of the Legion of Honour in 1948. He died in Strasbourg as the honorary administrator of the Bibliothèque Nationale et Universitaire de Strasbourg. He was also serving as the permanent secretary of the Académie Internationale d’Histoire des Sciences.

References

External links 
 Thesis by Wickhersheimer (1905)
 La médecine et les médecins en France à l'époque de la Renaissance (1906)

1880 births
1965 deaths
French physicians
Historians of science
University of Paris alumni
French librarians